Antoniotto Adorno may refer to the following:

 Antoniotto I Adorno (1340–1398), Doge of the Republic of Genoa (1378, 1384–1390, 1391–1392, 1394–1396)
 Antoniotto II Adorno ( 1479 – 1528), Doge of the Republic of Genoa (1522–1527)